Hathor 17 - Coptic Calendar - Hathor 19

The eighteenth day of the Coptic month of Hathor, the third month of the Coptic year. On a common year, this day corresponds to November 14, of the Julian Calendar, and November 27, of the Gregorian Calendar. This day falls in the Coptic season of Peret, the season of emergence. This day falls in the Nativity Fast.

Commemorations

Saints 

 The martyrdom of Saint Phillip the Apostle 
 The martyrdom of Saint Atrasis and Saint Junia

Other commemorations 

 The Commemoration of the Miracle of the moving of the Moqattam Mountain

References 

Days of the Coptic calendar